Andrew Joseph McDonald (October 24, 1923 – April 1, 2014) was an American prelate of the Catholic Church. He served as bishop of the Diocese of Little Rock in Arkansas from 1972 to 2000.

Biography

Early life 
The second youngest of 12 children, McDonald was born in Savannah, Georgia, to James Bernard and Theresa (née McGrael) McDonald. After graduating from Marist School for Boys, he studied at St. Charles College in Catonsville, Maryland.  McDonald then attended St. Mary's Seminary in Baltimore, obtaining a Licentiate of Sacred Theology (1948).

Priesthood 
McDonald was ordained to the priesthood for the Diocese of Savannah by Bishop Emmet M. Walsh on May 8, 1948. He then attended Catholic University of America in Washington, D.C.  He then traveled to Rome to enter the Pontifical Lateran University, earning a Doctorate in Canon Law in 1951. 

Upon his return to the South Carolina, McDonald was named chancellor of the Diocese of Savannah, official of the Diocesan Marriage Tribunal, and curate of a parish in Port Wentworth. He was named a papal chamberlain in 1956 and a domestic prelate in 1959. From 1963 to 1972, McDonald served as pastor of Blessed Sacrament Parish; he also served as vicar general of the diocese starting in 1967.

Bishop of Little Rock 
On July 4, 1972, McDonald was appointed the fifth bishop of the Diocese of Little Rock by Pope Paul VI. He received his episcopal consecration on September 5, 1972, from Archbishop Thomas McDonough, with Archbishop Philip Hannan and Bishop Gerard Frey serving as co-consecrators. McDonald was formally installed as bishop two days later, on September 7.

Unlike his predecessor, Bishop Albert Fletcher, McDonald followed the suggestion of the Second Vatican Council in instituting permanent deacons, largely because of the diocese's shortage of priests. McDonald was opposed to the U.S. Supreme Court's 1973 legalization of abortion rights for women in Roe v. Wade; he later established an anti-abortion office in the diocesan curia and led the annual March for Life each January in Little Rock. In 1982, McDonald invited Mother Teresa to open a home for single mothers in Little Rock.

A dedicated ecumenist, McDonald reached out to other denominations in Arkansas throughout his tenure, and once assisted in promoting a Billy Graham crusade at War Memorial Stadium in 1989. In 1990, McDonald condemned the execution of John Swindler by the State of Arkansas.  McDonald became known for his affable personality, his involvement with the laity, and his personal interest in those Catholics under his jurisdiction.

Retirement and legacy 
On January 4, 2000, Pope John Paul II accepted McDonald's resignation as bishop of Little Rock. Afterwards, McDonald lived outside of Chicago, Illinois, where he served as chaplain for the Little Sisters of the Poor.  Andrew McDonald died in Palatine, Illinois, on April 1, 2014 at age 90.

References

External links
Diocese of Little Rock

1923 births
2014 deaths
People from Savannah, Georgia
Roman Catholic bishops of Little Rock
20th-century Roman Catholic bishops in the United States
St. Charles College alumni
St. Mary's Seminary and University alumni
Catholic University of America alumni
Pontifical Lateran University alumni
Catholics from Georgia (U.S. state)
American expatriates in Italy